The 1990–1991 Philadelphia measles outbreak was a medical event in and around Philadelphia, Pennsylvania, in which over 1,400 people, mostly children, became sick with measles, and nine children died. There were two epicenters for this outbreak within the area: The Faith Tabernacle Congregation and the First Century Gospel Church. Both churches discouraged the use of not only vaccinations, but also all other forms of medical treatment, instead relying solely on faith healing. Following an investigation into the first death from the outbreak, a court order was obtained to forcibly treat and vaccinate children whose parents would not agree to seeking medical care.


History
Measles was likely imported into Philadalphia by a teenager who had visited Spain and later attended an April 1989 R.E.M. concert at the Philadalphia Spectrum arena. Other cases soon followed. 

The formally-defined outbreak began in October 1990, but the bulk of incidents of illness, and all of the related deaths and responses to them, occurred in 1991. From November 4, 1990, to March 24, 1991, 486 cases and 6 measles-associated deaths were reported to the Philadelphia Health Department from members of the two fundamentalist church communities, Faith Tabernacle Congregation and the First Century Gospel Church. The two churches promoted "a reliance on prayer, not medical care, to cure disease". By June 1991, an additional 938 measles cases and three deaths from outside the two churches were reported to the department. During this period, "the University of Pennsylvania also reported seven cases of measles among its students". All 9 deaths were among children.

In February 1991, it was reported that "Health workers are now going to the homes of all students in a frantic effort to monitor their conditions to prevent further deaths", and that local officials were "prepared to seek court orders to force the families to accept medical care if the children are in serious condition". Later analysis noted that "although measles is normally fatal in about 1 of every 300 cases, the fatality rate in Philadelphia was much higher, because only 1 child in the congregations received treatment for pneumonia and encephalitis among the children".

Dr. Paul Offit, director of the Vaccine Education Center at the Children's Hospital of Philadelphia, noted that forced vaccination was used in response to the outbreak. With respect to the parents who had initially refused vaccination, Offit said: "They were a peaceful lot. Once it was the law of the city, they realized it and they were pretty placid about it".

References

See also 
 Philadelphia Liberty Loans Parade
 COVID-19 pandemic in Philadelphia
 Followers of Christ

1990 in Christianity
1991 in Christianity
1990 in Pennsylvania
1991 in Pennsylvania
1990 disease outbreaks
1991 disease outbreaks
1990 disasters in the United States
1991 disasters in the United States
1990s in Philadelphia
Measles outbreaks
Health in Pennsylvania
Disasters in Pennsylvania
Disease outbreaks in the United States
Anti-vaccination in the United States
Supernatural healing
Christian fundamentalism